Hermann Paul Müller (21 November 190930 December 1975) was a German sidecar, motorcycle, and race car driver.

Müller started his competitive career on an Imperia in 1928.  He became German Sidecar Champion in 1932, then in 1936, he took the German 500cc Motorcycle title.

He switched to cars the next year, driving for Auto Union.  He won the 1939 edition of the FIA French Grand Prix held in Reims. The winner of that season's European Championship was never officially announced by the AIACR due to the outbreak of World War II. Although Müller would have won the championship on points, the president of Germany's highest motorsports organisation declared Hermann Lang the champion.

After the war he returned to motorcycle racing, winning the 1947 and 1948 German 250cc titles on DKW.  In 1955, he won the 250cc world championship riding an NSU Sportmax.  He also set quite a number of world speed records in five classes over six distances for NSU on the Bonneville salt flats in 1956. To this day he remains the oldest person to win a Grand Prix Motorcycle world championship, at the age of 46.

Racing record

Complete European Championship results
(key) (Races in bold indicate pole position)

Motorcycle Grand Prix results
Points system from 1950 to 1968.

(key) (Races in italics indicate fastest lap)

References

1909 births
1975 deaths
German motorcycle racers
125cc World Championship riders
250cc World Championship riders
500cc World Championship riders
Sportspeople from Bielefeld
People from the Province of Westphalia
German racing drivers
Racing drivers from North Rhine-Westphalia
National Socialist Motor Corps members
European Championship drivers
250cc World Riders' Champions